Mindil Aces Football Club is an Australian semi-professional soccer club based in Darwin, which competes in the NorZone Premier League.

History
The Aces advanced to the Round of 32 of the 2022 Australia Cup for the first time by defeating Casuarina FC 2–0 in the Sports Minister's Cup final. The draw for the Round of 32 was conducted on 28 June 2022 where Mindil was drawn against NPL Victoria club Avondale FC.

Current squad (2022)

References

Soccer clubs in the Northern Territory
1980 establishments in Australia
Association football clubs established in 1980
Sport in Darwin, Northern Territory